Francis Fletcher-Vane may refer to:
 Sir Francis Fletcher-Vane, 3rd Baronet, British landowner and aristocrat
 Sir Francis Fletcher-Vane, 5th Baronet, Irish-born British military officer and aristocrat